Raphael Elkan Samuel (26 December 19349 December 1996) was a British Marxist historian, described by Stuart Hall as "one of the most outstanding, original intellectuals of his generation". He was professor of history at the University of East London at the time of his death and also taught at Ruskin College from 1962 until his death.

Life

Samuel was born into a Jewish family in London. His father, Barnett Samuel, was a solicitor and his mother, Minna Nerenstein, was at various times composer and partner in Jewish publishers Shapiro, Valentine. Samuel joined the Communist Party of Great Britain when a teenager and left following the Soviet Union's invasion of Hungary in 1956.

Samuel was a member of the Communist Party Historians Group from a young age, alongside E. P. Thompson, Eric Hobsbawm and others, and would later study at Balliol College, Oxford under fellow member Christopher Hill. In 1957, he co-founded the magazine Universities and Left Review with Gabriel Pearson, Charles Taylor, and Stuart Hall, which would become, following its merger with The New Reasoner, the New Left Review in 1960. He also founded the Partisan Coffee House in 1958 in Soho, London, as a meeting place for the British New Left.

He founded the History Workshop movement at trade union connected Ruskin College, Oxford. Samuel and the History Workshop movement powerfully influenced the development of the approach to historical research and writing commonly called "history from below". 

In 1987 Samuel married the writer and critic Alison Light. Samuel's archive is held at Bishopsgate Library.

After Samuel's death in 1996, the East London History Centre of the University of East London was renamed the Raphael Samuel History Centre, in honour of his role in creating it. The Centre was established to investigate and document the history of London since the eighteenth century. Consistent with Samuel's belief that historical studies should extend outside the academy, the Centre encourages research in the community, and the publication of materials ranging from monographs by established scholars to student dissertations and "Notes and Queries" features in the local press. Since September 2009 the Raphael Samuel Centre has been a partnership between the University of East London, Birkbeck College and the Bishopsgate Institute.

In an obituary in the journal Radical Philosophy, Carolyn Steedman describes Samuel's work:Like Raymond Williams and Edward Thompson, he produced his historical work in interaction with working-class adult returners to education.... The standard charge against the history Samuel inspired was of a fanatical empiricism and a romantic merging of historians and their subjects in crowded narratives, in which each hard-won detail of working lives, wrenched from the cold indifference of posterity, is piled upon another, in a relentless rescue of the past. When he was himself subject to these charges, it was presumably his fine – and immensely detailed – accounts of the labour process that critics had in mind. But it was meaning rather than minutiae that he cared about.

Raphael Samuel was interred on the eastern side of Highgate Cemetery.

Selected bibliography 

 East End Underworld (1981)
 Theatres of Memory: Volume 1: Past and Present in Contemporary Culture (1994)
 Theatres of Memory: Volume 2: Island Stories: Unravelling Britain (1997)
 The Lost World of British Communism (2006)
 Workshop of the World: Essays in People's History (2023)

'Edited Collections
 Village Life and Labour, edited by Raphael Samuel (1975)
 Miners, Quarrymen and Saltworkers, edited by Raphael Samuel (1977)
 People's History and Socialist Theory, edited by Raphael Samuel (1981)
 Culture, Ideology and Politics, edited by Raphael Samuel and Gareth Stedman Jones (1983)
 Theatres of the Left: 1880–1935, Raphael Samuel, Ewan MacColl and Stuart Cosgrove (1985)
 The Enemy Within: The Miners' Strike of 1984 edited by Raphael Samuel, Barbara Bloomfield and Guy Boanas (1987)
 Patriotism (Volume 1): History and Politics, edited by Raphael Samuel (1989)
 Patriotism (Volume 2): Minorities and Outsiders, edited by Raphael Samuel (1989)
 Patriotism (Volume 3): National Fictions, edited by Raphael Samuel (1989)
 The Myths We Live By, edited by Raphael Samuel and Paul Thompson (1990)

References

Sources
McWilliam, Rohan, "Samuel, Raphael", pages 1047–1048 from The Encyclopedia of Historians and Historical Writing Volume 2, edited by Kelly Boyd, London: Fitzroy Dearborn Publishers, 1999, .
Thompson, Paul, "Raphael Samuel, 1934–96: An Appreciation", pages 30–37 from Oral History, Volume 25, 1997.

External links
A short bio for Raphael Samuel on Spartacus Educational
Profile in Radical Philosophywebsite of the Raphael Samuel History Centre
"Samuel, Raphael Elkan (1934-1996) historian", content description of Samuel's archive at Bishopsgate Library.
Raphael Samuel History Centre and Research at UEL
 Hilda Kean, "Remembering Raphael Samuel : Alison Light and A Radical Romance", 13 November 2019.
 Alison Light, "Diary | The death of Raphael Samuel", London Review of Books'', Vol. 23, No. 4, 22 February 2001.

1934 births
1996 deaths
20th-century English historians
Academics of Ruskin College
Academics of the University of East London
Alumni of Balliol College, Oxford
Communist Party Historians Group members
Burials at Highgate Cemetery
Communist Party of Great Britain members
English Jews
English people of Belarusian-Jewish descent
English people of Russian-Jewish descent
Jewish socialists
Marxist theorists